The Ambassador Extraordinary and Plenipotentiary of the Russian Federation to Antigua and Barbuda is the official representative of the President and the Government of the Russian Federation to the Prime Minister and the Government of Antigua and Barbuda.

The Russian ambassador to Antigua and Barbuda is a non-resident ambassador, who holds the post of ambassador to Jamaica, where he and his staff work at large in the Embassy of Russia in Kingston. The ambassador holds dual accreditation to Jamaica, Antigua and Barbuda, the Dominican Republic, Saint Lucia, and Saint Kitts and Nevis.

History of diplomatic relations
The formal establishment of diplomatic relations between the Soviet Union and Antigua and Barbuda took place in January 1990. The incumbent Soviet ambassador to Jamaica, was appointed to serve concurrently as ambassador to Antigua and Barbuda on 20 August 1990. With the dissolution of the Soviet Union in 1991 Romanchenko continued as representative of the Russian Federation until 1994.

List of representatives (1990 – present)

Representatives of the Soviet Union to Antigua and Barbuda (1990 – 1991)

Representatives of the Russian Federation to Antigua and Barbuda (1991 – present)

References

External links

Antigua and Barbuda
Antigua and Barbuda–Russia relations
Russia